Arabis armena, the Armenian rockcress, is a species of rockcress that is found in Armenia and Nakhichevan (Azerbaijan). It grows at mid- and high-altitudes. It is threatened by the trampling of cattle.

See also 

 List of Arabis species

References

armena
Flora of Armenia
Flora of Azerbaijan
Near threatened flora of Asia
Near threatened biota of Europe